Renee Reid (born 28 May 1978) is a former professional tennis player from Australia.

Biography
Reid, who grew up in Sydney, was a product of the Australian Institute of Sport and played on the professional tour in the late 1990s, with a best ranking of 174 in the world.

Reid competed in Australian Open qualifying for the first time in 1996, where she had a win over Patty Schnyder, before falling in the second round. In 1997 she lost to Amelie Mauresmo in qualifying, then in 1998 received a wildcard into the main draw. In what would be her only main draw appearance, Reid was beaten in the opening round by Elena Likhovtseva. She also completed in the women's doubles with Samantha Smith.

She is the elder sister of tennis player Todd Reid.

ITF Circuit finals

Singles (2–3)

Doubles (1–5)

References

External links
 
 

1978 births
Living people
Australian female tennis players
Australian Institute of Sport tennis players
Tennis players from Sydney
20th-century Australian women